The Sumba hornbill (Rhyticeros everetti) is a large bird in the Bucerotidae, or hornbill family.  The scientific name commemorates British colonial administrator and zoological collector Alfred Hart Everett.

Description
It is a medium-sized, blackish hornbill, approximately 70 cm long.  The male is dark reddish-brown on the crown and nape, with a paler neck. The female has entirely black plumage. Both sexes have a large, dull, yellowish bill with a maroon patch at the base, a serrated casque, and an inflatable blue throat.

Distribution and habitat
An Indonesian endemic, the Sumba hornbill inhabits semi-evergreen forests of Sumba in the Lesser Sunda Islands.

Behaviour
The Sumba hornbill is a monogamous species. Its diet consists mainly of fruits.

Status and conservation
Due to ongoing habitat loss, limited range, small population size and overhunting in some areas, the Sumba hornbill is assessed as Vulnerable on the IUCN Red List of Threatened Species. It is listed on Appendix II of CITES. Part of its habitat is protected in the Laiwangi Wanggameti National Park and the Manupeu Tanah Daru National Park.

References 

 BirdLife Species Factsheet
 Red Data Book

Sumba hornbill
Sumba hornbill
Birds of Sumba
Sumba hornbill